Tom Clancy's Ghost Recon Frontline is a cancelled live-service first-person massively multiplayer online PvP class-based tactical shooter battle royale game by Ubisoft announced on October 6, 2021. It was under development for Microsoft Windows, PlayStation 4, PlayStation 5, Xbox One and Xbox Series X/S, plus Amazon Luna and Google Stadia. On July 21, 2022, Ubisoft announced that it had cancelled development of the game.

Development and cancellation 
The first trailer received a huge number of dislikes on YouTube. Ubisoft promoted a giveaway for Ghost Recons 20 years anniversary.

Because of an undisclosed reason, possibly the negative public reception, Ubisoft cancelled the alpha test and delayed it indefinitely.

On January 28, 2022, Ubisoft launched a closed beta for the game under confidentiality agreements, although gameplay soon leaked onto Twitch. The footage was heavily criticized for being visually and conceptually similar to Call of Duty: Warzone, another free-to-play battle royale game.

In July 2022, Ubisoft announced that it had cancelled the project.

References

External links 
 

Ubisoft games
Tom Clancy's Ghost Recon games
Video games developed in Romania
Tom Clancy games
Cancelled PlayStation 4 games
Cancelled Stadia games
Cancelled Xbox One games
Cancelled Windows games